The 1995 Davidoff Swiss Indoors was a men's tennis tournament played on indoor carpet courts at the St. Jakobshalle in Basel, Switzerland that was part of the World Series of the 1995 ATP Tour. It was the 26th edition of the tournament and was held from 25 September until 1 October 1995. Fifth-seeded Jim Courier won the singles title.

Finals

Singles

 Jim Courier defeated  Jan Siemerink 6–7(2–7), 7–6(7–5), 5–7, 6–2, 7–5
 It was Courier's 4th singles title of the year and the 18th of his career.

Doubles

 Cyril Suk /  Daniel Vacek defeated  Mark Keil /  Peter Nyborg 3–6, 6–3, 6–3

References

External links
 ITF tournament edition profile

Davidoff Swiss Indoors
Swiss Indoors
1995 Davidoff Swiss Indoors
1995 in Swiss tennis